Henry Latimer Walters   (24 January 186817 March 1929) was a senior Australian public servant, best known for his time as head of the Department of Works and Railways.

Life and career
Walters was born in Newcastle, New South Wales on 24 January 1868.

Shortly after Federation, in 1902, he joined the Commonwealth Public Service as an accountant.

Between 1926 and his death in 1929, Walters was Secretary of the Department of Works and Railways.

Walters died at his home on Tennyson Street in St Kilda, Melbourne on 17 March 1929 after 18 months of illness. He was buried in Cheltonham cemetery.

Awards
Walters was made a Companion of the Imperial Service Order for his services as Secretary of the Commonwealth Works Department in June 1928.

References

1868 births
1929 deaths
Australian public servants
Australian Companions of the Imperial Service Order
Deaths from cancer in Victoria (Australia)
People from Newcastle, New South Wales